Senator Chabert may refer to:

Leonard J. Chabert (1932–1991), Louisiana State Senate
Marty J. Chabert (born 1956), Louisiana State Senate
Norby Chabert (born 1975), Louisiana State Senate